Council of Crimea may refer to:
 State Council of Crimea,  the regional parliament of the Republic of Crimea, an unrecognized republic in the Russian Federation since 2014
 Verkhovna Rada of Crimea, parliament of the Autonomous Republic of Crimea, an autonomous republic in Ukraine, dissolved after the Russian annexation of Crimea